Jerry Drake (born July 9, 1969) is a former professional American football defensive lineman who spent for six seasons with the Arizona Cardinals.

1969 births
Living people
Sportspeople from Kingston, New York
Players of American football from New York (state)
American football defensive tackles
American football defensive ends
Arizona Cardinals players